Christopher Benjamin (born May 26, 1975) is a Canadian journalist, novelist and non-fiction writer.

Education 
Benjamin completed a Bachelor of Commerce from Dalhousie University (Halifax, Nova Scotia, Canada) in 1997 and a Master of Environmental studies (MES) from York University (Toronto, Ontario, Canada) in 2001. During his MES, Benjamin completed a six-month term in Makassar, Indonesia and subsequently published "Sharing Environmental Information in Makassar" in the anthology From Sky to Sea, published by the University of Waterloo Press in 2005.

Influences 
Much of Benjamin's writing has been influenced by his work and travel in the Caribbean, West Africa, East and Central Asia and Europe. From 2006 to 2007, Benjamin worked as a Development Correspondent at The Statesman, a daily national newspaper in Accra, Ghana.

Personal 
Benjamin currently lives in Halifax, Nova Scotia with his wife and two children.

Works

Non-fiction 

 "Eco-Innovators: Sustainability in Atlantic Canada" (Nimbus, 2011) – Winner of the 2012 APMA Best Atlantic-Published Book Award; Finalist for the 2012 Evelyn Richardson Non-Fiction Award; listed in the Top 5 Atlantic Canadian books of 2011 by Arts East Magazine.
 The Shubenacadie Indian Residential School" (Nimbus, 2014; ISBN TBD) – Winner of the 2013 Dave Greber Freelance Writer Award in the book category

Fiction 
Drive-By Saviours (Roseway, 2010) – Winner of the 2008 Percy Prize – Top Novel in the Atlantic Writing Competition; Long-listed for a 2011 ReLit Award; Long-listed for CBC Canada Reads 2011; selected to Salty Ink's top-notch books of 2010 list

Journalism 
Since 2012, Chris Benjamin has been a columnist and regular contributor to Halifax Magazine. He was a regular contributor to Openfile Halifax until it went on hiatus in 2012. Since 2008, Benjamin has been a regular contributor and Sustainable City columnist with The Coast Magazine in Halifax, Nova Scotia.  From 2006–2007, Benjamin worked as a Development Correspondent with The Statesman, a daily newspaper in Ghana.
Benjamin has also published widely in other regional and national publications, including:

 "Clinical Culture Clash: The IWK's midwifery program was sabotaged by the hospital's own administration, say women who left", published by The Halifax Chronicle Herald, Sun, February 6, 2011
 "Rebuilding Halifax's Most Feared Neighbourhood", published by The Globe and Mail, September 25, 2010
 "The myth of the wealthy environmentalist" in Briarpatch Magazine, July/August 2009 – Honourable Mention 2009 National Magazine Awards
 "Retooling Schooling" in Briarpatch Magazine, September 2009
 "The destable solution: Prison reform in Ghana" in Briarpatch Magazine, May 2009
 "Incubating Ideas: Fernwood celebrates 20 years of radical publishing" in Briarpatch Magazine, July 2012
 "Midwifery is ready for delivery, but mainstream public health lags", published by This Magazine, February Issue, 2010
 "Imagine Fewer Schools", published by the Nova Scotia Policy Review, Cover Story, June 2008
 "Who Are the Real Crazies Here?", published by Now Magazine, News, April 14, 2005

Anthologies

 "The water bottle thief" in Everything is Political (Fernwood, 2013).
 "Let us reinvent the wheel" in Year One Anthology (Open Heart Forgery, 2011)
 "Bill on a Code of Ethic for the Province" in Year One Anthology (Open Heart Forgery, 2011)
 "The Law Won" in Descant 150: Writers in Prison (Issue 150, Vol. 41, No. 3, Fall 2010)
 "The Futurology of Fatherhood" in Nova Scotia: Visions of the Future Anthology (Pottersfield Press, July 2009)
 "Sharing Environmental Information in Makassar" in From Sky to Sea: Environment and Development in Indonesia (S.K. Wismer, T. Babcock, and B. Nurkin (Eds). Waterloo, Ontario, University of Waterloo, Department of Geography Publication Series No. 61.)

Radio

 "The Forest and the Trees", CBC Radio One, Maritime Magazine, aired Sunday, January 20, 2013

References

External links 

Living people
Canadian male journalists
Canadian male novelists
21st-century Canadian novelists
Canadian non-fiction writers
Journalists from Nova Scotia
1975 births
Dalhousie University alumni
York University alumni
Writers from Halifax, Nova Scotia
21st-century Canadian male writers